Paulo Rangel do Nascimento Gomes (born 4 February 1985) is a Brazilian footballer.

Club career

Perak
In April 2013, Perak signed Rangel on loan from Muangthong United for an undisclosed fee. On 14 April, he scored during his league debut against PKNS in the match that ended draw 2–2. Rangel scored a hat-trick against Johor Darul Ta'zim as Perak won 3–0.

Selangor
In November 2013, Rangel joined Selangor from Muangthong United. Rangel made his official Selangor debut on their opening matchday of the 2014 season against T-Team at Petaling Jaya Stadium. He scored a brace to help Selangor win 2–0.

On 1 April 2014, Rangel scored his first hat-trick for Selangor against Vietnamese side Hanoi T&T in the 2014 AFC Cup. Rangel scored another hat-trick in the AFC Cup on 23 April 2014 against Maziya from Maldives.

Terengganu
On 26 November 2014, Rangel signed with Terengganu. Rangel was suspended for 6 months after kicking the ball at a second assistant referee as well as shoving the referee in the Semi Final of Malaysia FA Cup 2015 against LionsXII.
After one season playing for Terengganu, Rangel been released from the club.

Johor Darul Ta'zim
Rangel signed a two-year contract with Johor Darul Ta'zim on 29 December 2015, after becoming a free agent since October. The contract signing ceremony was held at the Tan Sri Dato' Hj Hassan Yunos Stadium in Larkin, Johor Bahru, Malaysia. He replaced the retired Luciano Figueroa, completing the club’s quota of four foreign imports and will link up with new strike partner Jorge Pereyra Díaz. However he was not made any appearances for the club and been demoted to Johor Darul Ta'zim II.

Johor Darul Ta'zim II
During the pre-season with Johor Darul Ta'zim, Rangel found out it difficult to adapt to club playing style. He was then demoted to Johor Darul Ta'zim II and made his debut in a 1–3 defeat to DRB-Hicom.

Londrina
For the 2017 season, Rangel returned to Brazil and signed for Londrina.

Nakhon Ratchasima
Midway through the season, Rangel made a return to Thailand and signed for Nakhon Ratchasima F.C.

Kedah FA
Rangel signed a 6 months contract for Kedah FA on 23 May 2018. He made his super league debut for Kedah against his former team Selangor FA on 26 May 2018. He scored his first goal for his new side in a 1-0 victory against Kelantan. On 13 July 2018, he missed a penalty against his former side Johor Darul Ta'zim and also earned a red card after kicking former teammate Farizal Marlias.

Honours
Muangthong United
Thai Premier League: 2012

Tuna Luso
Campeonato Paraense Second Division: 2020
 
Individual
Malaysia Super League Golden Boot: 2014

References

External links

Paulo Rangel at ZeroZero

Living people
1985 births
Sportspeople from Belém
Brazilian footballers
Brazilian expatriate footballers
Boavista F.C. players
F.C. Maia players
Dibba Al-Hisn Sports Club players
Santa Cruz Futebol Clube players
São Raimundo Esporte Clube footballers
São José Esporte Clube players
Paulo Rangel
Perak F.C. players
Selangor FA players
Terengganu FC players
Johor Darul Ta'zim F.C. players
Varzim S.C. players
Gondomar S.C. players
A.D. Lousada players
Associação Cultural e Desportiva Potiguar players
Salgueiro Atlético Clube players
Esporte Clube São José players
Clube Esportivo Lajeadense players
Sociedade Esportiva e Recreativa Caxias do Sul players
Cuiabá Esporte Clube players
Associação Desportiva Recreativa e Cultural Icasa players
Londrina Esporte Clube players
Paulo Rangel
Kedah Darul Aman F.C. players
Paysandu Sport Club players
Tuna Luso Brasileira players
Madureira Esporte Clube players
Clube Atlético Linense players
Primeira Liga players
Liga Portugal 2 players
Campeonato Brasileiro Série B players
Campeonato Brasileiro Série C players
Campeonato Brasileiro Série D players
Paulo Rangel
Malaysia Super League players
UAE First Division League players
Association football forwards
Brazilian expatriate sportspeople in Portugal
Brazilian expatriate sportspeople in Thailand
Brazilian expatriate sportspeople in Malaysia
Brazilian expatriate sportspeople in the United Arab Emirates
Expatriate footballers in Portugal
Expatriate footballers in Thailand
Expatriate footballers in Malaysia
Expatriate footballers in the United Arab Emirates